A hub is the central part of a wheel that connects the axle to the wheel itself.

Hub, The Hub, or hubs may refer to:

Geography

Pakistan
 Hub Tehsil, Balochistan, an administrative division
 Hub, Balochistan, capital city of the tehsil
 Hub Dam, in Balochistan
 Hub River, in Balochistan

United States
 Hub, California, an unincorporated community
 Hub, Mississippi, an unincorporated community

Elsewhere
 Hub Nunatak, Graham Land, Antarctica

Buildings in the United States
 HUB Tower, Des Moines, Iowa
 Hub (Minneapolis, Minnesota), a residential apartment building in Minneapolis
 Hub Building, Burwell, Nebraska, on the National Register of Historic Places

Organizations
 Harvard University Band
 Hogeschool-Universiteit Brussel, Belgium
 Hub International, a North American insurer
 Hub Power Company, first and largest Pakistani Independent Power Producer

Transport
 Airline hub
 Transport hub

Codes
 HUB, Guobiao abbreviation of Hubei, a province of China
 HUB, station code for Hunmanby railway station, Hunmanby, North Yorkshire, England
 hub, ISO 639-3 code for Huambisa language of Peru

People
 Hub (given name), a list of people with the given name or nickname
 Hub (artist), artist and illustrator of Okko magazine
 Hub (bassist), American musician Leonard Nelson Hubbard (c. 1959–2021)
 Hub (wrestler), main ring name of Japanese professional wrestler Yuto Kigawa (born 1978)

Other uses
 Hub (network science)
 Ethernet hub
 Discovery Family,  formerly "Hub Network", a US cable TV channel
 Kearney Hub, a daily newspaper published in Kearney, Nebraska
 Verizon Hub, a media phone
 Habu, a snake

See also
 The Hub (disambiguation)
 Hub City (disambiguation)